WIRA (1400 AM) is a radio station currently broadcasting Latin-American music. Licensed to Fort Pierce, Florida, United States, the station serves the Vero Beach area, but also reaches to Sebastian, Florida. The station is currently owned by Carline Clerge, through licensee Caribbean Media Group, Inc. In addition, this radio station is also popularly known as "La Nueva" and is re-transmitted through the frequency 104.9 FM.

History
The station went on the air as WYFX on 1996-11-01.  On 1997-08-15, the station changed its call sign to the current WIRA.

References

External links

IRA
Fort Pierce, Florida
Radio stations established in 1996
1996 establishments in Florida